Ronald Robert Williams (September 24, 1944 – April 4, 2004) was an American basketball player.

A 6'3" guard from Weirton, West Virginia, Williams starred at West Virginia University in the mid-1960s, where he was one of the school's first African American basketball players. He was selected by the San Francisco Warriors with the ninth pick of the 1968 NBA draft, and was also drafted as a defensive back by the Dallas Cowboys in the 14th round of the 1968 NFL Draft. He played eight seasons in the NBA as a member of the Warriors, the Milwaukee Bucks, and the Los Angeles Lakers.  Williams averaged 9.3 points and 3.5 assists per game in his professional career and ranked third in the league in free throw percentage during the 1970–71 NBA season.

After his playing career ended, Williams held several basketball coaching positions, including stints as an assistant coach at the University of California, Berkeley and Iona College. He died of a heart attack in 2004.

Career statistics

NBA

Regular season

|-
| align="left" | 1968–69
| align="left" | San Francisco
| 75 || - || 19.6 || .420 || - || .768 || 2.4 || 3.3 || - || - || 7.8
|-
| align="left" | 1969–70
| align="left" | San Francisco
| 80 || - || 30.4 || .432 || - || .822 || 2.4 || 5.3 || - || - || 14.8
|-
| align="left" | 1970–71
| align="left" | San Francisco
| 82 || - || 34.3 || .436 || - || .844 || 3.0 || 5.9 || - || - || 14.4
|-
| align="left" | 1971–72
| align="left" | Golden State
| 80 || - || 24.2 || .474 || - || .833 || 1.8 || 3.9 || - || - || 9.7
|-
| align="left" | 1972–73
| align="left" | Golden State
| 73 || - || 13.9 || .440 || - || .904 || 1.1 || 1.6 || - || - || 6.0
|-
| align="left" | 1973–74
| align="left" | Milwaukee
| 71 || - || 15.9 || .489 || - || .882 || 1.0 || 2.2 || 0.7 || 0.0 || 6.3
|-
| align="left" | 1974–75
| align="left" | Milwaukee
| 46 || - || 11.4 || .376 || - || .828 || 0.9 || 1.5 || 0.5 || 0.0 || 3.2
|-
| align="left" | 1975–76
| align="left" | Los Angeles
| 9 || - || 17.6 || .395 || - || .769 || 2.1 || 2.3 || 0.3 || 0.0 || 4.9
|- class="sortbottom"
| style="text-align:center;" colspan="2"| Career
| 516 || - || 22.2 || .441 || - || .833 || 1.9 || 3.5 || 0.6 || 0.0 || 9.3
|}

Playoffs

|-
| align="left" | 1968–69
| align="left" | San Francisco
| 4 || - || 10.5 || .385 || - || 1.000 || 1.0 || 0.8 || - || - || 6.0
|-
| align="left" | 1970–71
| align="left" | San Francisco
| 5 || - || 34.4 || .381 || - || .895 || 3.4 || 5.8 || - || - || 13.0
|-
| align="left" | 1971–72
| align="left" | Golden State
| 5 || - || 16.6 || .290 || - || style="background:#cfecec;" | .933* || 1.6 || 2.0 || - || - || 6.4
|-
| align="left" | 1972–73
| align="left" | Golden State
| 3 || - || 6.7 || .667 || - || 1.000 || 0.3 || 1.7 || - || - || 3.0
|-
| align="left" | 1973–74
| align="left" | Milwaukee
| 15 || - || 23.6 || .467 || - || .800 || 1.8 || 3.1 || 0.6 || 0.2 || 8.7
|- class="sortbottom"
| style="text-align:center;" colspan="2"| Career
| 32 || - || 21.0 || .419 || - || .881 || 1.8 || 2.9 || 0.6 || 0.2 || 8.1
|}

College

|-
| align="left" | 1965–66
| align="left" | West Virginia
| 28 || - || - || .443 || - || .728 || 5.3 || - || - || - || 19.7
|-
| align="left" | 1966–67
| align="left" | West Virginia
| 28 || - || 37.2 || .455 || - || .710 || 4.3 || 7.0 || - || - || 20.1
|-
| align="left" | 1967–68
| align="left" | West Virginia
| 28 || - || - || .422 || - || .783 || 3.8 || 5.5 || - || - || 20.4
|- class="sortbottom"
| style="text-align:center;" colspan="2"| Career
| 84 || - || 37.2 || .439 || - || .741 || 4.5 || 6.3 || - || - || 20.1
|}

References

1944 births
2004 deaths
African-American basketball players
Basketball coaches from West Virginia
Basketball players from West Virginia
Golden State Warriors players
Los Angeles Lakers players
Milwaukee Bucks players
Parade High School All-Americans (boys' basketball)
People from Weirton, West Virginia
Point guards
San Francisco Warriors draft picks
San Francisco Warriors players
Shooting guards
West Virginia Mountaineers men's basketball players
American men's basketball players
20th-century African-American sportspeople
21st-century African-American people